Alexandra Lilian Amelia Abrahams (born 13 July 1986) is a South African politician serving as a Member of the National Assembly since May 2019. She was appointed as Shadow Deputy Minister of Social Development in December 2020. Abrahams is a member of the Democratic Alliance.

Biography
Abrahams obtained an honours degree in political science from Stellenbosch University. She also has an undergraduate degree in international relations.

Abrahams joined the Democratic Alliance in 2009, when she became the assistant to the party's provincial campaign manager for that year's general election. Two years later, she found employment at the provincial Department of Social Development. She worked for the department until May 2019.

Abrahams was placed third on the DA's regional list for the general election on 8 May 2019. As a result of the DA's electoral performance, Abrahams was elected. She was sworn in as a Member of the National Assembly on 22 May 2019. As of 27 June 2019, she serves as an Alternate Member of the Portfolio Committee on Social Development.

In December 2020, the DA parliamentary leader, John Steenhuisen, appointed her to his shadow cabinet as Shadow Deputy Minister of Social Development.

References

External links
Ms Alexandra Lilian Amelia Abrahams at Parliament of South Africa

Living people
1986 births
Members of the National Assembly of South Africa
Democratic Alliance (South Africa) politicians
21st-century South African women politicians
21st-century South African politicians
People from the Western Cape
Stellenbosch University alumni